John Shepherd may refer to:

 John Shepherd (priest) (died 1713), Irish Anglican priest
 John Shepherd (jockey) (1765–1848), English jockey
 John Shepherd (governor and chairman)  (1792–1859), governor of the Hudson's Bay Company and Chairman of the East India Company
 John James Shepherd (1884–1954), British Olympic tug of war competitor
 John Shepherd (footballer, born 1932) (1932–2018), English footballer for Millwall, Brighton & Hove Albion and Gillingham
 John Shepherd (cricketer) (born 1943), West Indian cricketer
 John Shepherd (diplomat) (born 1943), British diplomat
 John Shepherd (footballer, born 1945), English footballer for Rotherham United, York City and Oxford United
 John Shepherd (scientist) (born 1946), British Earth system scientist
 John Shepherd (Australian politician) (1849–1893), Member of the New South Wales Legislative Assembly, 1877–1880
 John Shepherd (actor) (born 1960), American actor and producer
 John Shepherd (physicist) (born 1962), American medical physicist
 John Thompson Shepherd (1919–2011), British-American physician and medical researcher

Characters 
 John Elwood Shepherd, a character in the unfinished manga Zombiepowder.

See also
 Jack Shepherd (disambiguation)
 John Sheppard (disambiguation)
 John Shepard III (1886–1950), American radio executive and merchant, owner of the Shepard Department Store in Boston, MA
 John Shepherd-Barron (1925–2010), Scottish inventor